Ryan Guldemond (born November 24, 1986), is the lead vocalist, songwriter and guitarist of the Canadian indie rock band Mother Mother, which he formed on Quadra Island, British Columbia with his sister Molly Guldemond (on vocals and keyboard).

Early life 
Guldemond grew up in Quadra Island in British Columbia, with sister and bandmate, Molly. The siblings did not play together in their youth, only deciding to start a band as adults. Guldemond has described working through issues with substance abuse and has noted that in the past these issues have negatively impacted his relationship with Molly, though their relationship has strengthened post-sobriety. He has discussed sobriety as an important influence on Mother Mother's sixth album, No Culture, particularly the single "The Drugs".

Career 
At music school, Guldemond decided to start a band based on vocal-driven pop songs. He recruited his sister, Molly, along with a friend from college, Debra-Jean Creelman, to accompany his vocals for the songs they had written. The trio played as an acoustic act in Vancouver in January 2005 before adding drummer Kenton Loewen and bassist Jeremy Page to form Mother, a 5-member band.

In the fall of 2005, they independently released a self-titled album. Later, in October of 2006, the name of the band was amended to Mother Mother.

Guldemond played an unnamed character in the movie Hot Tub Time Machine alongside ex-Mother Mother bandmate Jeremy Page.

Guldemond is also an experienced music producer, having worked with Hannah Georgas on her album, This is Good.

In 2022, Guldemond started his solo project GLDMTH (pronounced "gold mouth"), focusing on acoustic songs with lyrics portraying beauty in everyday life. In August 2022, Guldemond released the single "The People" followed shortly by a self-titled LP.

References

External links
Mother Mother Official website

Canadian indie rock musicians
Musicians from British Columbia
People from Campbell River, British Columbia
Canadian rock singers
Canadian rock guitarists
Canadian male guitarists
Living people
1986 births